Calandula  (pre-1975: Duque de Bragança), also spelled Kalandula is a town and municipality in Malanje Province in Angola. The municipality had a population of 80,415 in 2014.

See also
Kalandula Falls

References

Populated places in Malanje Province
Municipalities of Angola